Mariano Caporale (born 11 January 1985) is a retired Argentine football player who played in Argentina, Mexico, Bangladesh and Israel.

References

External links
 
 

1985 births
Living people
Argentine footballers
Argentine expatriate footballers
Argentinos Juniors footballers
Maccabi Netanya F.C. players
Atlético Bucaramanga footballers
Defensa y Justicia footballers
Club Atlético Los Andes footballers
Expatriate footballers in Israel
Expatriate footballers in Mexico
Expatriate footballers in Colombia
Association football defenders